Michael Heltzen (22 June 1712 – 10 September 1770) was a Norwegian mining engineer.

He was born in Christiania (now Oslo), Norway. He was the son of Helle Michelsen (1674-1725) and Sophie Cathrine Paulsdatter Vogt (d. 1723).
He started studies at the University of Copenhagen. In 1733, he went on a several-year study trip in Europe, where he toured German mining operations. 
He was assigned a position as civil servant at Kongsberg from 1740.

Heltzen chaired the committee for the construction of Kongsberg Church. The church was consecrated in 1761. Heltzen was a leading force in the interior decoration and furnishings, which were changed compared to the original plans. The church interior in Rococo style reflects the rock community's hierarchy, with chandeliers from Nøstetangen and Gloger organ as highlights.

In 1757, he was fundamental to the establishment of the Kongsberg School of Mines (Bergseminaret på Kongsberg). An academic institution for mining technology, it was at that time  one of Norway's few institution of higher technical and scientific education.

References

1712 births
1770 deaths
Engineers from Oslo
University of Copenhagen alumni
Norwegian mining engineers
Norwegian business executives